The 1955 Ukrainian Cup was a football knockout competition conducting by the Football Federation of the Ukrainian SSR and was known as the Ukrainian Cup.

Teams

Non-participating teams 
The Ukrainian teams of masters did not take part in the competition.
 1955 Soviet Class A (2): FC Dynamo Kyiv, FC Shakhtar Stalino
 1955 Soviet Class B (7): ODO Kiev, ODO Lvov, FC Metalurh Zaporizhia, FC Lokomotyv Kharkiv, FC Metalurh Dnipropetrovsk, FC Kharchovyk Odesa, FC Spartak Uzhhorod

Competition schedule

First elimination round

Second elimination round

Quarterfinals

Semifinals

Final 
The final was held in Kiev.

Top goalscorers

See also 
 Soviet Cup
 Ukrainian Cup

Notes

References

External links 
 Information source 

1955
Cup
1955 domestic association football cups